Turbo excellens is a species of sea snail, a marine gastropod mollusk in the family Turbinidae, the turban snails.

Distribution
This marine species occurs off Japan.

Description
The length of the shell varies between 10 mm and 22 mm. The imperforate shell has a globose-turbinate shape. Its color pattern is pale fleshy, vividly painted with reddish brown. The conic spire contains five convex whorls with narrowly channelled sutures. The whorls are spirally lirated with minute nodules. The penultimate whorl is trilirate. The body whorl is inflated, globose and almost square-shaped. The aperture is subcircular and silvery white on the inside. The peristome is simple. The white columella is thick and smooth. The operculum is almost round. Its outer surface is white, very convex and everywhere minutely granulate.

Notes
Additional information regarding this species:
 Taxonomic status: Some authors place the name in the subgenus Turbo (Callopoma)

References

External links
 To Encyclopedia of Life
 To World Register of Marine Species
 

excellens
Gastropods described in 1914